USS Edamena II (SP-14) was an armed motorboat that served in the United States Navy as a patrol vessel from 1917 to 1919.

Edamena II was built in 1916 by George Lawley & Son at Neponset, Massachusetts, as a private motorboat of the same name. The U.S. Navy acquired her from her owner, E.P. Charlton of Fall River, Massachusetts, on 22 May 1917 for World War I service. She was commissioned as USS Edamena II (SP-14) on 24 May 1917.

Edamena II was assigned to the 2nd Naval District and based at New Bedford, Massachusetts. She performed patrol and dispatch boat duties off southern New England until December 1918.

Edamena II was sold back to her former owner on 14 February 1919.

References

Department of the Navy: Naval Historical Center: Online Library of Selected Images: Civilian Ships: Edamena II (American Motor Boat, 1916). Served as USS Edamena II (SP-14) in 1917–1919.
NavSource Online: Section Patrol Craft Photo Archive Edamena II (SP 14)

Patrol vessels of the United States Navy
World War I patrol vessels of the United States
Ships built in Boston
1916 ships